The 1953–54 season was the fifty-second season in which Dundee competed at a Scottish national level, playing in Division A, where the club would finish in 7th place for the second consecutive season. Dundee would also compete in both the Scottish Cup and the Scottish League Cup. Dundee failed to defend their League Cup champion status for a third consecutive year, being knocked out of the group stages by goal ratio. As for the Scottish Cup, they would be upset by Division C side Berwick Rangers in the third round. This season would be the final for manager George Anderson, whose ill health forced him into retirement at the end of the campaign.

Scottish Division A 

Statistics provided by Dee Archive.

League table

Scottish League Cup 

Statistics provided by Dee Archive.

Group 4

Group 4 table

Scottish Cup 

Statistics provided by Dee Archive.

Player Statistics 
Statistics provided by Dee Archive

|}

See also 

 List of Dundee F.C. seasons

References

External links 

 1953-54 Dundee season on Fitbastats

Dundee F.C. seasons
Dundee